ABC Under-18 Championship for Women 2004 is the 17th edition of ABC's basketball championship for females under 18 years old. The games were held at Shenzhen, China.

The championship is divided into two levels: Level I and Level II. The last finishers of Level I are relegated to Level II and the top finisher of Level II qualify for Level I 2007's championship.

Participating teams

Preliminary round

Level I

Level II

Final round

Semifinals

3rd place

Final

Final standing

Awards

External links
JABBA

2008
2004 in women's basketball
2004–05 in Asian basketball
2004–05 in Chinese basketball
International women's basketball competitions hosted by China
2004 in youth sport